
Gmina Tolkmicko is an urban-rural gmina (administrative district) in Elbląg County, Warmian-Masurian Voivodeship, in northern Poland.

The gmina contains part of the protected area called Elbląg Upland Landscape Park.

Villages
Apart from the town of Tolkmicko, Gmina Tolkmicko contains the villages and settlements of Biała Leśniczówka, Bogdaniec, Brzezina, Chojnowo, Janówek, Kadyny, Kamienica Elbląska, Kamionek Wielki, Kikoły, Łęcze, Nadbrzeże, Nowinka, Ostrogóra, Pagórki, Pęklewo, Pogrodzie, Połoniny, Przybyłowo, Przylesie, Rangóry, Suchacz, Święty Kamień, Wodynia and Wysoki Bór.

Neighbouring gminas
Gmina Tolkmicko is bordered by the city of Elbląg and by the gminas of Elbląg, Frombork, Milejewo, Młynary and Sztutowo. It also lies next to the Vistula Lagoon.

References
Polish official population figures 2006

Tolkmicko
Elbląg County